Samuel Epstein may refer to:
 Samuel Epstein (physician)
 Samuel Epstein (geochemist)
 Samuel Epstein (politician)